"24 Hours" is the debut song by American singer TeeFlii. The song was released on May 12, 2014, by Excuse My Liquor and Epic Records as the lead single from his debut album Starr. It was produced by frequent collaborator DJ Mustard and features American rapper 2 Chainz.

Remix 
The song's official remix features new guest appearances by Ty Dolla Sign and Bobby Shmurda. Chris Brown and Trey Songz created their own remix to the song.

Music video
A music video for the track was released on May 29, 2014. It was directed by Colin Tilley.

Chart performance

Weekly charts

Year-end charts

References

2014 singles
2014 songs
2 Chainz songs
Epic Records singles
Song recordings produced by Mustard (record producer)
Songs written by Mustard (record producer)
Songs written by 2 Chainz
Songs written by Rico Love